Tiziana Lauri (born 25 December 1959) is a retired Italian ballet dancer.

Early life and education
Daughter of noted dancers Guido Lauri and Anna Maria Paganini, she followed in her parents's footsteps (although against their will) by training with Attilia Radice at the Rome Opera House. She entered the Rome Opera Ballet school at age 13, without having taken any previous dance classes.

Dancing career
After less than three years at the Rome Opera Ballet school she joined the Rome Opera Ballet company, becoming a soloist at the age of 18.

A very versatile, gifted and impetuously talented artist, she danced a wide range of Ballerina roles from Kitri in Don Quixote to Juliet in Romeo and Juliet.

She worked with a variety of personalities such as Rudolf Nureyev, André Prokovsky, Ekaterina Maximova, Vladimir Vasiliev, Patrick Dupond and many others.

TV career
Lauri often appeared on Italian television as a performer but also as a brilliant anchorwoman and interviewer.

Awards
Lauri was a recipient of the Gold medal at Carlo Blasis 1981 competition in Turin and of various prizes (Apollon Musagète 1986, Golden Perseus 1987, Michelangelo's David 1988, Talenti dello Spettacolo Internazionale 1989, and Berlin's Golden Bear and Cup 1990).

Family
In 1987 American review Dance Magazine wrote about her unusual kinship with several artists: four cousins were her colleagues and two paternal aunts, a paternal uncle and a maternal aunt and uncle were all Rome Opera Ballet dancers of the older generation. Her genealogical tree also includes grandfather Eliseo Paganini, a world-champion athlete, and famed opera singer Giulio Neri, her uncle.

Sources 

 WHO'S WHO IN THE WORLD, Sixth Edition 1982/83 U.S.A.
 DANCE MAGAZINE, "Rome Opera Ballet's talented première danseuse", April 1987.
 CHI E' DELLA DANZA IN ITALIA, L'Arabesque editrice (1992).
 TIZIANA LAURI: "Noi tutti dobbiamo imparare a corporizzare lo spirito e a spiritualizzare il corpo" - interview, 23/09/11 giornale della danza.com.
 TIZIANA LAURI: Archivio Storico e Audio-Visuale del Teatro dell'Opera di Roma Capitale (partial list).

References 

1959 births
Italian ballerinas
Living people
Dancers from Rome
20th-century Italian ballet dancers